Ecsenius randalli is a species of combtooth blenny in the genus Ecsenius. It is found the western central Pacific ocean, around Indonesia. It can reach a maximum length of 2 centimetres. Blennies in this species feed primarily off of plants, including benthic algae and weeds. The specific name of this blenny honours the American ichthyologist John E. Randall of the Bishop Museum in Honolulu, who collected the type, photographed it and permitted Victor G. Springer to describe it.

References
 Springer, V. G. 1991 (Aug.) [ref. 18995] Ecsenius randalli, a new species of blenniid fish from Indonesia, with notes on other species of Ecsenius. Tropical Fish Hobbyist v. 39 (no. 12): 100–113.

randalli
Fish described in 1991
Taxa named by Victor G. Springer